John D. Rockefeller (1839–1937) was an American business tycoon

John D. Rockefeller or John Rockefeller may also refer to:
John D. Rockefeller Jr. (1874–1960), son of John Sr.
John D. Rockefeller III (1906–1978), son of John Jr., grandson of John Sr.
Jay Rockefeller, or John D. Rockefeller IV (born 1937), son of John III, grandson of John Jr., great-grandson of John Sr.
John Sterling Rockefeller, American philanthropist, conservationist, and amateur ornithologist.